Andy Duncan (born 20 October 1977) is an English footballer who played as a centre-back.

He started his football career at Manchester United, but made no appearances and was loaned to Cambridge United on 9 January 1998. The loan was turned into a permanent move in April 1998 for a fee of £20,000.

By the end of the 2006–07 season, Duncan had made 328 appearances for United, scoring 11 times. In May 2007, he was released on a free transfer by the club. In July 2007 he was appointed to a part-time role working on the public relations/commercial side of the club and is responsible for promoting the club in an ambassadorial capacity. He has also signed as a player for Chelmsford City in the Isthmian League.

References

External links

1977 births
Sportspeople from Hexham
Living people
English footballers
Association football defenders
Manchester United F.C. players
Cambridge United F.C. players
Chelmsford City F.C. players
English Football League players
Cambridge United F.C. non-playing staff
Footballers from Northumberland